SV Bad Aussee was an Austrian association football club, from Bad Aussee. The club was dissolved in 2011.

Staff and board members
 Manager:  Ivo Gölz
 Assistant Manager: Thomas Heissl

External links
Official site
Regional League Central 

Defunct football clubs in Austria
Association football clubs established in 1932
1932 establishments in Austria